Iris Santos Hernández (born January 29, 1984 in Santo Domingo) is a female volleyball and beach volleyball player from Dominican Republic, who won the bronze medal in the women's beach team competition at the 2002 Central American and Caribbean Games in San Salvador, El Salvador, partnering Yudelka Bonilla. She represented her native country at the 2001 FIVB Girls' Youth World Championship in Croatia. She also played at the 2007 NORCECA Championship, winning the bronze medal with her team.

References
 2001 U-18 Championship Best Setters
 Norceca Championship 2007 

1984 births
Living people
Dominican Republic women's volleyball players
Dominican Republic beach volleyball players
Women's beach volleyball players

Central American and Caribbean Games bronze medalists for the Dominican Republic
Competitors at the 2002 Central American and Caribbean Games
Central American and Caribbean Games medalists in beach volleyball